Lucie Rothauer (née Böhm, born 12 October 1974) is an Austrian orienteering competitor.  She won the 1997 Short distance World Orienteering Championships, and obtained silver medal in 1999.

See also
 List of orienteers
 List of orienteering events

References

External links
 
 

1974 births
Living people
Austrian orienteers
Female orienteers
Foot orienteers
World Orienteering Championships medalists